Sakkuth is an Australian melodic metal band formed in Brisbane, Queensland in 1998. They describe themselves as "melodic metal". The band was active in the Brisbane heavy metal scene and around Australia for nearly 10 years.

Members

The beginning
Sakkuth was created by Adam Merker (guitars '94-'05) and Moises Contreras (vocals '94-present). Craig Hollywood was hired as second guitar, Wolfgang on Keyboard, Scott Ward on Drums and various Bass players tried to fill the slot while the band found its feet. After performing with this line-up the decision was made to look into other line up options. A number of line-up changes later, Scott McIvor was hired for lead guitar, Damien Biggers was poached from a local band after impressing Adam with his drumming on his previous band's demo. Lindal Loakes joined the band almost by accident and the lineup became complete. The first EP was recorded at "Soul Studios" on the Gold Coast in Queensland by Adam Keane (guitarist and producer of SoundSurgery). This independent release was well received by both fans and radio with the first song from the EP "Time and Sweet Nectar" receiving continual air time on "JJJ's" three hours of power and the evergrowing crowds at live shows. This track was also included on a JJJ metal compilation receiving national distribution.

After writing the songs for the first full-length "Quest from within" Sakkuth guitarist Adam Merker started Studio Anders Debeerz for the specific purpose of recording the band's music.

Previous Members
Lindal Loakes left the band prior to writing "Quest from Within" citing creative differences as the reason.

In Late 2005 Guitarist and co-founder, Adam Merker, left the band to spend more time with his family and to concentrate on his career as a producer/engineer (Studio Anders Debeerz).

Discography
From Wretched Blood
Murderous Intent
Restless
Suffering Dead
Devour Me
Rebirth
Addict
The Walking
Tomorrow We Die
As I Went Below
Torment of the Body and Soul
Don't Fight the Urge (re-issue) [2005]
Don't Fight the Urge [2002]
Reborn into Dreams
On My Shoulders – A video clip was made for the song "On My Shoulders"
Sleepwalker
Banshee Scream
Not For Me
Second Skin
As the Seas Turn Red
Don't Fight The Urge
Bonus Tracks
Time and Sweet Nectar
Burn
Quest from Within
Innocence is a Sin
Quest From Within Self-released [2000] Review
Last Words
Needle
Embraced
Quest from Within
Shut your Eyes
Burn
Moriquendi
By your hand
Lantern
Happiness so Forgotten
Sakkuth [EP] Self-released [1998]
Time and Sweet Nectar
Shattered Society
Stalking a Masterpiece
Ecstasy Haunting
The Calling of Time
Innocence is a Sin

Compilation albums
Their track Time and Sweet Nectar was included on the first edition of the compilation Full Metal Racket volume 1 released by Australia's music radio network Triple J in association with their heavy metal music program Full Metal Racket.

See also
 Moriquendi (Middle-earth)

References

External links
Official site
MySpace Page
Metal Archives profile:  Search "Sakkuth" in search box. The Metal Archives is a curated wiki devoted heavy metal music.
Brismetal profile: Brismetal is the primary site devoted to the heavy metal live music scene in Brisbane and surrounding cities (Ipswich, Logan City, Gold Coast, Sunshine Coast) run by the local promoters.
Gig info for brisbane can be found in the  brismetal.com gig page.

Musical groups from Brisbane
Musical groups established in 1998
Australian heavy metal musical groups